David Hawker (born 29 November 1958) is an English former footballer who made 130 appearances in the Football League playing for Hull City and Darlington in the 1970s and 1980s. A midfielder, he also played non-league football for clubs including Bishop Auckland, Brandon United, Whitley Bay, for whom he scored as Bay won the 1986–87 Northumberland Senior Cup final, and South Bank.

References

1958 births
Living people
Footballers from Kingston upon Hull
English footballers
Association football midfielders
Hull City A.F.C. players
Darlington F.C. players
Bishop Auckland F.C. players
Brandon United F.C. players
Whitley Bay F.C. players
South Bank F.C. players
English Football League players
Northern Football League players